Julie Kelly (born 28 January 1968) is an Irish professional pool, and former snooker, player. She won the WPA nine-ball world championship in 2000.

Biography
Kelly was a sheepherder in Ireland and won the Irish women's snooker championship a record seven times before travelling to the United States with her friend Karen Corr to take up pool. Kelly sold her sheep to help finance the move.

She beat Corr in the final to win the WPA nine-ball world championship in 2000, and had some other successes on the tournament circuit, including a victory over Allison Fisher to win the 2000 WPBA Canadian Classic.

Titles and achievements
Snooker
1991, 1992, 1993, 1995, 1996, 1997, 1998 Republic of Ireland Ladies' Snooker Association Champion

Pool
2000 WPA Nine-ball World Championship
2000 New York State Championship
2000 PP Tour 2000 #12 Women's Division 
2004 WPBA Canadian Classic

References

External links

Living people
Female pool players
Female snooker players
1968 births